Michael, Mick or Mike Kerr may refer to:

 Michael Kerr (judge) (1921–2002), British jurist, lawyer and author
 Michael Kerr, 13th Marquess of Lothian (born 1945), known as Michael Ancram, United Kingdom politician and MP
 Michael C. Kerr (1827–1876), American legislator and Speaker of the US House of Representatives
 Michael Kerr (rugby union) (born 1974), German rugby union international
 T. Michael Kerr (born 1962), American politician
 Mick Kerr (1934–2021), Tyrone Gaelic footballer
 Mike Kerr, lead singer and bassist of the English rock duo Royal Blood